County Route 557 (CR 557) is a county highway in the U.S. state of New Jersey. The highway extends  from Delsea Drive (Route 47) in Dennis Township to Main Street (CR 555) in Franklin Township. It is also referred to as Tuckahoe Road.

Route description

CR 557 begins at an intersection with Route 47 in Dennis Township, Cape May County, heading northeast on two-lane undivided Washington Avenue into forested areas. The route crosses into Woodbine and enters residential areas, intersecting CR 611 and CR 550/CR 638. At the intersection with the latter, CR 557 forms a concurrency with CR 550 and the two routes pass a mix of homes and businesses as it comes to Dehirsch Avenue, where CR 550 splits from CR 557 by heading southeast on that road. From this point, CR 557 continues north into Upper Township and becomes North Dennis-Marshallville Road as it continues into forested areas with occasional homes. Farther north, the route intersects CR 617 and turns east onto Mill Road, heading into residential areas in the community of Tuckahoe. The road crosses the Cape May Seashore Lines railroad line south of the Tuckahoe station, the Beesleys Point Secondary railroad line operated by the Cape May Seashore Lines railroad, and CR 659 within a short distance of each other before reaching a junction with Route 50 and CR 664. CR 557 forms a concurrency with Route 50 and the two routes head north through residential and commercial areas and encounter the eastern terminus of Route 49 before leaving Tuckahoe.

Not far after Route 49, the road crosses the Tuckahoe River into Corbin City, Atlantic County. In Corbin City, it heads into residential areas, with CR 611 looping to the west of the route. Route 50 and CR 557 continue northwest and intersect CR 648, where the road turns north into more forested areas. At the junction with CR 645, the route turns to the northeast and enters Estell Manor, becoming Broad Street. CR 557 splits from Route 50 by heading northwest on Tuckahoe Road into dense forests. The road comes to a bridge over the Beesleys Point Secondary and begins running immediately to the west of the railroad line, heading into wooded areas of homes as it crosses CR 637, with CR 557 Truck heading east along that route. Farther north, CR 557 enters Weymouth Township, where it crosses CR 669 before intersecting CR 666. The road continues into Buena Vista Township and crosses CR 552, at which point the railroad line begins to head farther east from the road. CR 557 continues through woodland with some farms and homes as it comes to the CR 540 junction. The road continues through more farmland and woodland as it reaches intersections with CR 681 and CR 671. CR 557 turns north onto Cumberland Road briefly before reaching an intersection with US 40 in commercial areas. At this point, CR 557 Truck joins CR 557 again and CR 557 turns northwest to run along US 40. The road comes to the southern terminus of Route 54 and the eastern end of CR 619, at which point it enters Buena. The road runs through the commercial center of town and crosses the Southern Railroad of New Jersey's Southern Running Track line before heading into inhabited areas. Upon splitting from US 40 at the CR 672 junction, CR 557 heads north into Franklin Township, Gloucester County on Tuckahoe Road, passing through forested areas of homes. CR 557 reaches its northern terminus at an intersection with CR 555 and CR 659, where Tuckahoe Road continues north as part of CR 555.

History 
The road from Tuckahoe to Woodbine was part of the Cape May Way, an auto trail running from Camden to Cape May.

Major intersections

CR 557 Truck

County Route 557 Truck is a  truck bypass of a portion of County Route 557 between Estell Manor and Buena Vista Township in Atlantic County. The  route follows Route 50 and U.S. Route 40. This routing bypasses a now-rebuilt bridge over the Beesleys Point Secondary on CR 557 in Estell Manor that had a weight restriction.

Major intersections

See also

References

External links 

New Jersey 5xx Routes (Dan Moraseski)
New Jersey Roads - CR 557 Truck

557
557
557
557